The Guardians of the Universe are a race of extraterrestrial superhero characters appearing in American comic books published by DC Comics, commonly in association with Green Lantern. They first appeared in Green Lantern (vol. 2) #1 (July 1960), and were created by John Broome and Gil Kane. The Guardians of the Universe have been adapted to a number of films, television programs, and video games.

The Guardians of the Universe are the founders and leaders of the interstellar law enforcement agency known as the Green Lantern Corps, which they administer from their homeworld Oa at the center of the Universe. The Guardians resemble short humans with blue skin and white hair. They are depicted as being immortal and are the oldest living beings created in the Universe.

History

Background
The Guardians evolved on the planet Maltus, being among the first intelligent life forms in the universe. At this time, they were tall, grayish-blue humanoids with black hair, who roughly resembled humans except for their skin color. They became scientists and thinkers, experimenting on the worlds around them. One experiment led to the creation of a new species, the Psions. In a pivotal moment, billions of years ago, a Maltusian named Krona used time-bending technology to observe the beginning of the Universe. However, this experiment, and later attempts to stop it, unleashed disaster upon all existence. Originally, the experiment splintered the Universe into the Multiverse and created the evil Anti-Matter Universe of Qward. Following the retroactive destruction of the Multiverse, it was revealed that Krona flooded the beginning of the Universe with entropy causing it "to be born old".

Feeling responsible for this, the evolved Maltusians relocated to the planet Oa (at "the center of the Universe") and became the Guardians. Their goal was simple: combat evil and create an orderly universe. They acted quickly on that goal. During this period, they slowly evolved into their current appearance, losing about half of their height and having their skulls grow larger. They now act as the leaders of the Green Lantern Corps, an interstellar police force which patrols the universe.

Consequences
Desiring to bring order, peace and harmony to all the universe, they created a mechanized police force composed of powerful, self-aware androids known as Manhunters. These Manhunters, resembling uniformed, blue-skinned humanoids, operated as cosmic police officers, much like the later Green Lanterns. They protected civilization and maintained peace in the Universe for millions of years, patrolling 3600 sectors into which the cosmos had been divided.

One day, the Manhunters collectively changed their directives and set out on a campaign to eradicate all organic life. Starting with Sector 666, they killed the people they had been created to protect, eradicating almost all life in the entire sector before the Guardians stopped them. Most Manhunters were decommissioned after the massacre of Sector 666, but the ones that escaped became the sworn enemies of their former masters and remained so until modern times.

The Manhunter rebellion caused the Guardians to split into groups with different goals. The Controllers believe the only way to protect the Universe is to control it. The Zamarons, consisting entirely of female Oans, felt no need to involve themselves in the Universe's problems at all. Over the years, both groups evolved to look dissimilar to the Guardians. Other groups also left the Guardians; one such group settled on Earth, becoming the source of leprechaun legends. The Apokolips campaign ended in a truce, with the Guardians forced to abandon a soldier (Raker Qarrigat) to Darkseid. Fearing dissension, they ordered all records of the Campaign expunged.

Survivors of the massacre of Sector 666 – beings labelled demons – banded together to form a nation called the Empire of Tears, which opposed the Guardians’ efforts and philosophy. They used dark magic to create a galaxy-spanning realm of chaos and evil. The Guardians eventually defeated the Empire and imprisoned its leaders, the Five Inversions, on the bleak world of Ysmault. The Guardians decided that magic was chaotic and posed a threat to the balance they desired to achieve. They labored to destroy sources of magic and suppress or imprison its users throughout the Universe. They succeeded in compacting much of the chaotic magic energy of the Cosmos and imprisoning it inside a star; part of it eventually escaped to become the Starheart.

Modern history
The Guardians were almost wiped out in the events of Emerald Twilight, the only survivor being Ganthet. They sacrificed themselves to create one final power ring, a power ring perhaps more powerful than all others before it. Oa was itself destroyed in a battle between Parallax and Kyle Rayner, but rebuilt in the events of "Legacy" as the final wish of Hal Jordan's former power ring. The Guardians have since been restored when Kyle Rayner, as Ion, recharged the Central Power Battery. Rayner lost his power and role as Ion but this sacrifice released all the Guardian's life forces from the dormancy in his ring. The Immortals first appeared as children but aged quickly and many seem to have returned to the identities they had before they created Kyle Rayner's power ring. Unlike before, however, the Guardians are male and female, rather than just male. While Kyle had made them children in order for them to grow up and become less cold than their predecessors, this had not worked. Instead, the Guardians were as cold and manipulative as they were before the Emerald Twilight, with the exception of Ganthet and Sayd. Also, one of them, Lianna, seemed to have reverted to the original Maltusian appearance in the process. Many of the Guardians revived by Kyle Rayner seemed to have disappeared, as only a handful now appear in the current Green Lantern issues, while dozens were revived by Kyle Rayner. Female Guardians appear in flashbacks to Hal Jordan's rookie days as a Green Lantern. Whether this is an oversight or a result of the events of Infinite Crisis has not been explained. With their revival, they began to rebuild the Green Lantern Corps using veterans to train the new ring-bearers. Alongside this experiment, the Guardians refortified Oa by creating a planet-wide armor and defensive system to prevent successful attacks against them. The Sinestro Corps War forces them to rewrite the Book of Oa and to add ten new laws. To date, four of the ten have been revealed. They also expelled Ganthet and Sayd from their rank, because of the discovery that they were in a romantic relationship with each other. Another reason for their expulsion was their quotation from the forbidden chapter of the Book of Oa, which has Abin Sur's discovery of the prophecy The Blackest Night. 

In the aftermath of the War, both Ganthet and Sayd have evolved into two new beings on a paradise-like planet Odym, where they are harnessing the blue energy spectrum of hope and creating blue power rings and batteries, planning to create another intergalactic police force in order to be able to aid the Guardians and the Green Lantern Corps against The Blackest Night. The rank of the Guardians has weakened, as well; while there were originally twelve of them as Head Guardians, there are now six of them, after Ganthet and Sayd left Oa, and one Guardian died after a battle with Superman-Prime—this Guardian willfully "detonated" himself in an unsuccessful, last-ditch effort to destroy the insane Kryptonian (who wished to destroy the Universe in his own right). A female Guardian has been left scarred by the Anti-Monitor, and the exposure to his antimatter energy reveals to have had dire consequences. Her fellow Guardians were unaware of the changes within her, either physical or behavioral (she is far more militant than is normal for the Guardians). In the Origins and Omens backup stories running through several DC releases in February 2009, she is given the official name of Scar. Scar killed one of her fellow guardians in the beginning of the Blackest Night, and is later revealed that she has since died after the Anti-Monitor's attack, and functions as an undead instead of an immortal. Another guardian was killed by Nekron, as a sacrifice to summon the Entity on Earth.

The Guardians seemed extremely displeased with the appearance of the other corps. While they "tolerated" the existence of the Star Sapphires, they made it clear that they were going to exterminate the Red Lantern Corps. They also made a deal with Larfleeze of the Orange Lantern Corps some time ago, which resulted in the Vega System being out of Green Lantern jurisdiction. However, they seem to show particular displeasure with the Blue Lantern Corps, going so far as to attempt to forcibly remove the blue ring acquired by Hal Jordan, and when that didn't work, attempting to hold him on Oa until such time as it could be removed. With the ultimatum delivered by Larfleeze, the current wielder of the orange power of avarice, Scar proposed lifting the ban on the Vega System as well as having the Guardians leave Oa to get involved in the conflict personally.

The Guardians accepted Scar's proposal and left Oa with Hal Jordan and the Green Lantern Corps to confront Larfleeze in the Vega System. The Guardians also decided to see how Jordan's blue ring would function with his green one during battles. After the Agent Orange's defeat, the Guardians negotiated with Larfleeze once more in order to continue to keep the orange light of avarice contained. The Agent Orange later launched an attack on Odym, seeking to possess the powers of the Blue Lantern Corps, presumably being swayed by Scar.

During the Blackest Night, the Guardians finally realized that Ganthet and Sayd were correct in their interpretation of the prophecy discovered by Abin Sur. However, Scar killed a Guardian and bound the rest to prevent them from interfering. She later sent a number of black power rings to the Green Lantern Corps' memorial, reviving the deceased members of the Corps as undead Black Lanterns. She also weakened Oa's planetary defenses for an attack from the Black Lantern Corps. When a group of Green Lanterns found their way into the Guardians' chamber, they found it empty, with no sign of Scar or her captives. Scar had taken her captives to the dead planet of Ryut, home of the Black Lantern's Central Power Battery. Scar teleported herself, the Guardians, and the Black Lantern Central Power Battery to Earth, directly on top of Black Hand's home, and Black Hand summoned Nekron to Coast City. In the midst of the battle, Nekron killed a Guardian and Black Hand used his blood and organs to raise "The Trespasser" from the ground, holding a white figure. Ganthet revealed the entity to be the living embodiment of life in the universe. It seemed Earth was where life first began, a fact the Guardians did their best to hide, to keep the entity safe from harm and exploitation, redirecting that danger towards themselves by informing the majority of the universe that life began on their planet of Oa (despite the fact that the Oans were in fact born on the planet Maltus).

During the War of the Green Lanterns storyline, the Guardians had been discussing the various events occurring, ranging from Hal Jordan's allegiance with the New Guardians to the revolt of the Alpha Lanterns and so on. The group is then later confronted by Krona, who reveals his plan to control emotions. As a result, he had the Ion, the Predator, Butcher, Ophidian, Ion, Adara, and Proselyte inhabit the six Guardians as hosts and placed Parallax back within the Green Central Power Battery to subjugate the Green Lantern Corps under his control. The Guardians are freed from Krona's emotional control by Hal Jordan, who kills Krona using his ultimate power. The rings from the other corps return to their former wielders. However, the Guardians expel them from Oa. The Guardians believe Hal to be the most dangerous of the Green Lantern Corps; therefore, the Guardians wrongfully discharge him from the Corps, much to the Green Lantern Corps' chagrin. Afterward, the Guardians of the Universe allow Sinestro to become a Green Lantern once more. However, the Green Lantern Corps learn from empathy Lantern Meadlux that the Guardians are afraid of Hal Jordan, fearing that what happened to Krona would eventually happen to them if Jordan was allowed to continue as a Green Lantern. Later, when the Green Lantern Corps are in disagreement and attempt to kill Sinestro, the Corps break into the sciencells, but the Corps discover that the Guardians have in captivity Sinestro and are trying to remove Sinestro's green ring, but the ring will not be removed. Later, the Green Lantern Corps were in a meeting by the Guardians, where they chose to continue the fight and that any intrusion would incite a mutiny. The other Green Lantern Corps are in agreement.

The New 52
With Kyle Rayner having rebelled against the Guardians to join the 'New Guardians', a makeshift team consisting of representatives from all seven Corps, Hal Jordan's recent expulsion (although he has been forced to assist Sinestro's activities), and the 'recommendations' of the now-emotionless Ganthet, the Guardians are preparing to create the 'Third Army' to replace the Green Lantern Corps. This would involve them recovering the mysterious 'First Lantern' for an undefined role, prompting Sinestro, who learned about this prophecy after touching the Book of the Black, to enlist Hal's aid in stopping this scheme.

The Guardians began searching for the Book of the Black by tracking Starstorm, who was one of the last people to have had contact with the Book. When he proves useless to them, the Guardians kill Starstorm without mercy. Furthermore, it was revealed that they were the masterminds behind the release of Abysmus, one of Atrocitus' early experiments at creating life by the use of necromancy and shamanic rituals, so he could try to destroy the Red Lantern Corps by poisoning their Central Power Battery. It is also speculated that they were the masterminds behind the release of Archangel Invictus from Larfleeze's prison and the fall of the Blue Lantern Corps during the Reach invasion in Odym. Secretly, they also were pleased with the outcome of the Alpha War which saw the death of all Alpha Lanterns as it kept their hands clean of any involvement as they intended to destroy their Green Lanterns whilst bringing about the rise of the Third Army.

In order to do so, the Guardians of the Universe traveled to the Chamber of Shadows, where they had sealed other Oans away for billion of years. As the Guardians open the Chamber, the imprisoned Oans believe that they were finally joining them, but the Guardians clarify that they are there for the First Lantern. The other Oans were stunned by the Guardians (who have become unemotional), telling them that keeping the First Lantern captivity was their objective. The Guardians attack the other Oans, and a Guardian kills the elder Oan named Reegal, as they take the First Lantern, Volthoom that is trapped inside, and seal the other Oans back in the Chamber of Shadows. The Guardians intervene with the Black Lantern, Black Hand, charging him up with enough power to drain Green Lanterns Hal and Sinestro, after learning and finding out that Hal Jordan is wearing a Green Power Ring and becoming a member of the Green Lantern Corps again, which apparently kills them both, as well as the discharge of Hal Jordan once again. The Guardians then use the power of the First Lantern to create the Third Army from their own flesh and will, and so the "Rise of the Third Army" has begun.

The Guardians begin an evil agenda, as they assign John to track down Mogo's dead remains, due to claims that they are moving and trying to reform it. The Guardians then promote Guy as the 'Sentinel Lantern' and entrust him with guarding a group of ambassadors travelling to a planet for a crucial conference, only to subsequently release Xar, Guy's old enemy, from the Science-Cells. They presume Xar will go after Guy's family on Earth, knowing that Guy will abandon his duty and return to Earth while Xar attacks the ambassadors. The Guardians' plans have changed after Guy breaks off the attack from the Third Army and survives; the Guardians then frame Guy for failing his duty to protect the ambassadors, who were killed and expel him from the Green Lantern Corps. Suspicious about the Guardians' agenda, Salaak's began spying on them and discover they had already spread the Third Army across the universe, but the Guardians caught him before he can reveal this information, and imprison Salaak in the Citadel. The Guardians watches the Third Army spread over the universe, destroying all life and free will. They have told the First Lantern that once the Third Army completes their control over the whole universe, there will be no need for him. Later, the Guardians realize they cannot completely control the universe and need more members of the Third Army. They use more of the power of the First Lantern, without realizing that the First Lantern's prison is breaking.

The Guardians fool the Green Lanterns into a meeting to paralyse them, so they can reveal the reason behind their plan to replace the Green Lantern Corps with the Third Army. However, they are thwarted by Guy's diversion after he survives his fate at the hands of the Third Army and discovers their involvement with the Third Army. Kilowog then used his oath to cause the Central Power Battery to depower so that he could send distress calls to all the Green Lanterns and warn that the Guardians have turned against their own Corps. The Green Lantern Corps, including Guy Gardner (who rejoined them after finding out their plans), join the New Guardians and Atrocitus' Manhunters that arrive to rebel against the treacherous Guardians. When they are able to destroy the Third Army, Volthoom breaks free by taking the wounded Guardians' energy power and igniting the light, apparently resulting in the destruction of the universe.

The Guardians then wake up imprisoned on the planet Maltus by Volthoom, who restores Ganthet's emotions. It is revealed that when Krona tried to observe the beginnings of the universe, his experiment allowed a vessel to emerge on Oa where inside was a figure in a spacesuit with a bright lantern battery. Calling himself Volthoom, this being had traveled across time and space and it was him who apparently tutored the Maltusians about the power of the Emotional Spectrum and at some point was given the name of The First Lantern. However, during one of Krona's experiments involving the Great Heart, he witnessed the creation of The First Ring, which he attempted to claim for himself, only to be infused with the combined emotional awareness of the Maltusians themselves. He was deemed dangerous and unstable by the nascent Guardians of the Universe who were threatened by his great power. Thus, it was ultimately decided to imprison him within The Chamber of Shadows, a lantern shaped construct built near a black hole, where he was trapped inside for untold millennia. A number of Oans remained behind to ensure that The First Lantern was kept imprisoned and became known as The Hidden Ones, while those that remained embarked on their mission of policing the universe with the Manhunters. The First Lantern's custodians and wardens vowed that he would never be released, due to the dangers he posed. According to Krona, the Guardians were responsible for betraying the First Lantern. His only legacy on Oa was within The Foundry in the area that stored the Power Gauntlet, where an inscription mentions The First Lantern. Volthoom intends to feed off the other Lanterns' emotions in order to fuel his own emotional powers. When Volthoom is slain by Nekron, while Hal Jordan is now a member of the Green Lantern Corps, the Guardians are freed, but are then executed by Sinestro for the destruction of Korugar, although he spared one Guardian to Atrocitus. Sinestro spares Ganthet and reunites him with Sayd, but exiles them from Oa. The Malthusians who guarded Volthoom become the new "Templar Guardians". Because they are so out of touch with the current state of the universe, the Templar Guardians appoint Hal as a temporary leader of the Corps while they set out on a voyage of learning.

DC Rebirth
Subsequently, in DC Rebirth, while the Green Lantern Corps returned, Ganthet, Sayd, and the Templar Guardians were attacked and abducted by the Controllers. They wanted to harvest Templar Guardians' power to empower the Controllers. Four Green Lanterns of the Earth, however, were able to locate the Controllers' base at sector 3001 and attacked. After the Controllers were defeated and escaped, Ganthet announces that the Templar Guardians will return as the new Guardians of the Universe and will be their legacy.

The last surviving Guardians then assist the Corps through several incidents involving Zod and the return of the Darkstars. It is during this time the new guardian council delay and second-guess their orders, not wanting to become like their predecessors. However during The Cyborg Superman's infiltration of the Corps technology and the central power battery, guardian Kada Dal is murdered. Although the Cyborg Superman's plan is stopped by Hal Jordan, it will take some time to purge his influence from the Corps. With Mogo recovering the guardians decide to move the Corps to a New Oa. 

Now there are only 5 surviving Guardians: Ganthet, last of the original Guardians, Sayd, last of the reborn Guardians, Rami the renegade guardian, Zalla, and Paalko, last of the Templar guardians.

However as time passes, they too decide to depart from the main universe to participate in something they refer to as the "Ultrawar". They upgrade Hal's Green Lantern Power Battery and task him to venture to the Guardians' homeworld of Maltus and recruit new, younger Guardians to oversee the Corps. Partnered with the sentient salt Lantern Ryk, Hal is able to accomplish his daring, ambitious assignment but the new Guardians may be more than he bargained for. Visibly younger than their predecessors, as per the Guardians' instructions, the new Guardians are vocally unimpressed with the current way the Green Lantern Corps is being run. Frustrated by the antiquated practices and traditions in place, the new Guardians vow to change things as they settle into their roles overseeing the universe's premier peacekeeping force -- with the Guardians' omnipotent power at their disposal.<ref>The Green Lantern: Season 2 #1</ref>

Powers and abilities
Functionally immortal, Guardians resemble short (approximately 4 feet [120 cm] tall), large-headed, white-haired pale blue humans wearing red robes with their emblem, the Green Lantern symbol, on the chest. They possess vast knowledge, durability, awareness, flight, and psionic powers manifested through green plasma energy drawn from the most stable color of the emotional spectrum, green (willpower). Although, since it has been said that they chose the most stable color of the spectrum, it is possible that the Guardians may have limited access to all colors. In Green Lantern: Rebirth, Kyle Rayner is recorded saying that Ganthet could crack a planet in half with a thought and have been shown able to stagger Superman-Prime and the Anti-Monitor. The Guardians display the power of time travel as they send a time-lost Kyle Rayner back to his present timeline.

Appearance
The Guardians usually appear as diminutive, blue-skinned humanoids wearing red robes and white tabards bearing their crest, the Green Lantern symbol. The appearance of the male Guardians is modeled after former Prime Minister of Israel David Ben-Gurion.

After their rebirth, the females are typically bald and have female characteristics, such as breasts, more noticeable eyelashes and lips, and tend to be less wrinkled and aged looking. Their male counterparts tend to have short, unkempt, white hair, and to be more wrinkled and aged looking. One long going inconsistency between artists has been the relative size of the Guardians' heads to their short bodies, most artists designing them with larger heads to suggest their larger brains and alien anatomy, whereas others have been shown to draw near enough human-like proportional heads. Another difference has been their ears, which have been seen to be human-like, and on other occasions, to be elf-like. Their eye color also frequently changes between artists, usually between blue and green.

The Guardians' attire originally featured a long red robe with a stylized, Dracula-like collar, and their symbol emblazoned on the chest. Following their rebirth, this changed to them wearing a long red robe with a more scholarly collar, and a white tabard with their emblem on the chest area. They have also been shown by some artists to wear white undershirts, the sleeves of which can be seen sometimes under the robe's sleeves. Though their feet are not usually seen beneath their robes, they have been shown to wear red, pointed shoes.

Guardians known by name
It has been said that "Guardians do not take names", yet when Krona invaded Oa in the War of the Green Lanterns story-arc, he revealed that all Oans have names but have since forgotten them. Nonetheless, a few of their lot have been named in the stories. It was eventually revealed that the reason for the Guardians having forgotten their names was because they had removed their own emotions in order to defeat Volthoom before he could nearly destroy the universe and becoming unemotional for fear of emotions . Among them:

 Appa Ali Apsa – Appa Ali Apsa (a.k.a. "the Old-Timer" and/or "the Mad Guardian") is one of the immortal Guardians of the Universe, creators of the law-keeping Green Lantern Corps. After Green Arrow points out to the Guardians that they are too distanced from the mortals they have sworn to protect, the Guardians choose Appa Ali Apsa as their representative to experience life on Earth. Travelling across the US with Green Lantern Hal Jordan and Green Arrow, Appa experiences many adventures and learns some valuable lessons about life. He later renounces his Guardian title, powers and immortality, and chooses to travel the universe. Later, after the Crisis on Infinite Earths, Appa Ali loses his mind and is killed by his former brethren. In Post-Flashpoint continuity, Apsa is a member of The Circle, a group of powerful beings that also includes Sardath, King Myand'r of Tamaran, and Lord Gandelo.
 Broome Bon Barris
 Basilus
 Dawlakispokpok - 
 Dennap
 Ganthet – Created the Blue Lantern Corps along with Sayd.
 Herupa Hando Hu – His name is revealed by Krona.
 Lianna – A second-generation Guardian who was altered by Heartstone and raised by a Zamaron.
 Kontross
 Krona – A renegade Guardian of the Universe. One of the most powerful foes of the Green Lantern Corps.
Pazu Pinder Pol
 Sayd – Created the Blue Lantern Corps along with Ganthet.
 Scar – Her true name is unrevealed. Her alias is gained due to a distinctive scar on the right side of her head, which was a result of her fighting the Anti-Monitor. Subsequently, she began to deviate considerably from the traditional personality of a member of the Guardians. She was depicted as dark, militaristic, and fascinated by the power of death. Her eyes, which usually bore the symbol of the Green Lantern Corps in the pupil, contained the symbol of the Corps with whom she was presently associating (e.g., the symbol of the Sinestro Corps appeared in her pupils when she informed them of Sinestro's impending execution). She began encouraging the Green Lantern Corps to take on a more aggressive stance in the pending War of Light.
 Valorex
 Pale Bishop – A former Guardian of the Universe who turned his back on his kind when they started to use the Emotional Spectrum and instead founded The Paling, anti-emotion religious monks called Pale Vicars who turn people into emotionless followers. On his quest to purge emotion from the universe, The Paling was defeated by the Sinestro Corps over Earth with the Pale Bishop dying at the hands of Sinestro.
 Rami – Apparently the creator of the power rings, in his first attempt, he created a ring that can channel any light and can be used by any bearer which was later nicknamed as the "Phantom Ring", however because this ring was not without flaws, he later created other power rings that can only channel the green light of the Emotional Spectrum. The other Guardians of the Universe were later forced to excommunicate him over his creation of the "Phantom Ring". He was recently accepted back into the Templar Guardians.
 Gurion – A Templar Guardian. Considered deceased by his brethren after his DNA was forcefully harvested by the Controllers who changed him into one of them.
 Paalko – A Templar Guardian
 Reegal – A Templar Guardian. He was killed when the Guardians travelled to the Chamber of Shadows where they met Reegal who asked his kin whether they had saved the universe. However, the Guardians claimed that circumstances had changed and that they required the First Lantern. This went against the oath that the Hidden Ones had taken as they were well aware of the danger posed by the First Lantern if he was freed. Thus, they attacked the Guardians as they intended to honor their oath. During the battle, Reegal's throat was slit by one of the Guardians and the Hidden Ones were shocked as a result which allowed the Oans to take the First Lantern from the Chamber. When Black Hand was teleported into the Chamber of Shadows, he discovered Reegal's body in the outer corridor of the chamber. The Black Lantern resurrected Reegal as an undead being so he could interrogate him about the location of the prison.
 Quaros – A Templar Guardian. Instead of assisting Kyle Rayner and his kin after Relic's defeat, he felt compelled to journey through the universe and discover its secrets. Of the Templar Guardians, he is said to have the most insight into the workings of the cosmos.
 Yekop – A Templar Guardian. Considered deceased by his brethren after his DNA was forcefully harvested by the Controllers who changed him into one of them.
 Zalla – A Templar Guardian.
 Kada Sal – A Templar Guardian.
 Natos – A Templar Guardian. Considered deceased by his brethren after his DNA was forcefully harvested by the Controllers who changed him into one of them.
 Nemosyni - A female Guardian of the Universe who gave Jo her power ring. Sister of Koyos. She along with her brother betrayed the Corps resulting in nearly all of the Lanterns having been killed or their rings losing all power.
 Koyos - A male Guardian of the Universe and brother of Nemosyni. He went rogue and became the Anti-Guardian after betraying the Corps and destroyed the Green Lantern Central Power Battery on Oa. He later became the only Maltusian alive in the entire Universe, after targetting the planets Zamaron, Helix and Odym and killing everything that was from Maltusian lineage. Koyos was eventually defeated and killed by John Stewart.

There were also others that became Guardians of the Universe but aren't actually Oans.

 Master Builder – John Stewart, the only mortal Guardian of the Universe
 Sinestro – Sinestro briefly bonds with the White Entity, becoming the first White Lantern, and claims the title of Guardian of the Universe, before losing the connection in the fight against Nekron in the Blackest Night
 Sodam Yat – The last Guardian of the Universe in the 30th Century.

Artifacts and structures
During the height of their species civilization on their homeworld of Maltus and after being tutored about the emotional spectrum energy, the Guardians of the Universe created an unknown number of artifacts before finally creating the power rings which were given to the Green Lantern Corps. The known artifact are as follows:

 Power Gauntlet – a device created by Krona and the initial attempt of controlling the green energy connected to the Emotional Spectrum. In appearance, it resembled a green backpack that connected to a gauntlet by way of a cable between the two. It was attached to its own Power Battery supply. This gauntlet was capable of wielding the green energy and directed it by way of the users capacity to overcome fear. This allowed them to generate energy blasts capable of destroying targets within their way. Wielders simply needed to make a verbal indication for the power of the gauntlet to be activated and were seemingly only capable of being used by those who allowed themselves to feel emotions.
 Power Rings – After thousands of years trying to cope with the energies of the Emotional Spectrum, the Guardians of the Universe had finally achieved their greatest feat by forging of the first Power Ring, apparently just a simple piece of jewelry resembling a ring which actually was an advanced device that can control any energy connected to the Emotional Spectrum, allowing the generation of solid-light constructs, the precise physical nature of which has never been specified. The size, complexity, and strength of these constructs is limited only by the ring-bearer's emotion; whatever the wearer imagines, the ring will create. Later seven rings were created to channel the green light and much later two rings were created that could harness all the energies of the emotional spectrum. However, because it was their first attempt to channel the emotional energy, the rings were not without its flaws and those who don it became corrupted by its powers. With time this technology would eventually be evolved and be used by other organizations to create the current power rings to access the different energies that compromise the emotional spectrum.
 The Great Heart – Created primarily to function in conjunction with the power rings, after the First Lantern became corrupted and brought chaos to the universe, the Guardians of the Universe determined that emotions themselves were a weakness as well as impediment to their evolution and that they themselves needed to be divorced from them in order to properly govern the cosmos. As a result, the Guardians removed emotions from their own forms which they siphoned into a single receptacle to contain it. Thus, all their sentiments and feelings were locked away in the Great Heart. The device itself was located beneath the surface of Maltus where it was situated within an underground city and situated at the top of a spire. Protection of this region was provided by a trio of android-like bipedal machines that were tasked with guarding the city.
 Green Lantern Power Battery – After settling on the planet Oa, the Guardians created a massive device that served as a reservoir for all of their combined cosmic power which was based on the Green Light of Will in the Emotional Spectrum.
 A'Tmatentrym - The Source of Peace as its written in the Book of Oa is a creation made before the Manhunters, as the Guardians feared the power and disorder of the emotional spectrum. This strange creature can resist every weapon that is used against it and paradoxically can only be defeated by those who refuse to fight it.
 Power Battery – Served as an energy conduit to the Green Lantern Central Power Battery on Oa. Their first servants were the Manhunters that used the Power Batteries to charge their Energy Pistols. When the Manhunters rebelled, the Power Batteries and Energy Pistols were stripped from them and handed over to the Hallas. Eventually, that organization was also retired and the Power Battery became a common equipment amongst the Green Lantern Corps and were used to charge the Green Lantern Power Rings.
 Manhunters – Robotic androids that were created by the Guardians of the Universe to stop the First Lantern rampage and was their initial attempts at creating an interstellar police force with which to combat evil all over the cosmos and eradicate it.
 Energy Pistols – Weapons that were crafted by the Manhunters to serve as their primary weapons and charged by Power Batteries that were linked to the Central Power Battery on Oa. 
 Starheart – An orb that was created after the Guardians of the Universe attempted to remove magic from the universe, and laid siege to the necromantic forces of the cosmos. This collective force was hidden in the heart of a star and grew in power and eventually gained self-awareness as the Green Flame of Life. Though the Guardians were powerful, the force of magic was something that could not be contained forever.
 Emerald Eye of Ekron – After the failure of the Manhunters, the Guardians built a construct known as Ekron whose right eye possesses properties and powers similar to those of the Green Lanterns' power rings, and was designed as the rings' prototype.
 The Foundry – A subterranean chamber complex on the planet Oa which was crafted with advanced technology as a means of creating Power Rings and Power Batteries. This chamber contains a large number of secret projects that the Guardians had created in their long existence. These included holding tanks that contained the Psions, manufacturing plants for Manhunters and conversion platforms for Alpha Lanterns.
 The Chamber of Shadows – Located in a black hole, this cube shaped stony structure was built early in the Guardians' history when they decided to bring order to a chaotic cosmos. During this time, great power was imparted onto a being that they called The First Lantern but they were ultimately forced to imprison this being. According to Krona, the Guardians betrayed the First Lantern and locked him within a Lantern shaped device which in turn was placed within the Chamber of Shadows which became a prison with numerous chains encompassing it.
 The Vault of Shadows – A hidden mausoleum built early in the Guardians' history apparently just after the imprisonment of the First Lantern. It is located in space sector 180 at the edge of the known Universe and it is considered a sister structure to the Chamber of Shadows. It is where the Guardians' keep all their forbidden knowledge and also where the first seven Green Lantern's bodies are located including the first Lantern Ring.

Other versions

JLA: The Nail
In the alternate reality of JLA: The Nail (where Superman was discovered by a different family after the Kents had a nail in their car tire on the day they would have recovered him), the Guardians recalled the entire Green Lantern Corps minus Hal Jordan (who was trapped on Earth by a Kryptonian force field) to intervene when the cold war between Apokolips and New Genesis escalated.

Superman & Batman: Generations
In the reality of Superman & Batman: Generations, the Guardians revealed that Alan Scott's power ring was actually a Green Lantern ring despite its apparent weakness to wood after Hal Jordan successfully harnessed it against Sinestro, realising that the ring actually had no weaknesses except what the user believed it possessed; the Green Lantern Corps were vulnerable to yellow only because they believed the Guardians when they were told about this weakness, and Alan's ring's weakness to wood was caused when he was taken by surprise and struck on the back of the head with a wooden block during his first time using the ring.

Flashpoint
In the Flashpoint reality, the Guardians of the Universe assigned Abin Sur to head to Earth and find the White Lantern Entity. The Guardians contact him once again to retrieve the Entity which Abin Sur refuses stating that he will retrieve the Entity after he helps the Earth population against the Atlantis/Amazon war. The Guardians grow impatient with Abin Sur, discharging from the Corps. However, the White Lantern Entity chose Abin Sur to be its champion.

Injustice: Gods Among Us
In Year Two of the prequel comic to the game, Ganthet convinces the Guardians that Superman's recent actions on Earth to force peace border on tyranny, and suggests they intervene before it goes too far. Ganthet and Guy Gardner go to Earth to confront Superman, who maintains his actions are for the Earth's best interests. It is made impossible to reason with the fallen Man of Steel as he had discovered a truth behind the Guardians: years before they chose not to do anything as the planet Krypton exploded, allowing most of a race to be wiped out. Though Ganthet argues this is because they do not use their power to solve every problem, Superman rejects him and the Guardians, leading to an all-out war between the Green Lantern Corps and Superman's Regime (which also includes Sinestro Corps). Ganthet is later killed alongside numerous Green Lanterns, forcing the Guardians to leave Earth alone.

Earth One
In Green Lantern: Earth One, the Guardians founded the Green Lantern Corps as a galactic peacekeeping force thousands of years ago. However, feeling that the Green Lanterns had become too wilful and independent, they created the robotic Manhunters as a replacement. The Manhunters decimated the Corps as planned, but then turned on the Guardians, apparently killing all but one. The last Guardian fled to an alternate dimension, and began work on a third force to replace the Manhunters. Hundreds of years later, pseudo-Lantern Hal Jordan rediscovered the lost Central Power Battery on Oa, now a mining planet at the heart of the Manhunter's empire. The Guardian contacted Jordan through the Battery and, after telling a slightly distorted version of the history of the Guardians, Corps and Manhunters, instructed him to summon the last remaining ringbearers to Oa and create a feedback loop between their power rings and the Battery, thereby destroying the Lanterns and the Manhunters, allowing the Guardian to return with all threats to his power removed. However, one of the ringbearers was a physicist who was able to devise a way to control the feedback loop. Therefore, the Lanterns survived the explosion and came together as a united force again, much to the Guardian's annoyance. At the end, the Guardian - feeling fear is more effective than willpower - establishes the Yellow Lantern Corps.

All Star Batman: Metal
In Earth -32 of the Dark Multiverse, the Dawnbreaker Batman massacred most of the Corps, and all of the Guardians were left as skeletons, except one, presumably Ganthet, who the Dawnbreaker killed by ripping off his head.

Earth Three

The Overlords of Oa are the Earth-3 Guardians. They command the Emerald Knights who are their version of the Green Lantern corps. The Emerald Knights are given power ring’s with a sentient entity called Volthoom within them, the power rings subjugate the Emerald Knights by convincing the knight to trust the ring and fully devote themselves to the Oans above all else. The Emerald Knights conquer planets for the Oans.

In other media
Television
 The Guardians of the Universe appear in The Superman/Aquaman Hour of Adventure episode "Evil is as Evil Does", voiced by Paul Frees.

 The Guardians of the Universe appear in the Superman: The Animated Series episode "In Brightest Day...", voiced by Pat Musick and Peter Mark Richman. They approach Superman for him to help Kyle Rayner in defeating Sinestro. There is only one female Oan (predating the actual appearance of female Guardians in the mainstream DC Universe), who appears to be head of the council.
 The Guardians of the Universe appear in the Justice League episode "In Blackest Night", voiced by René Auberjonois. In this show, they appear in the same red robes as their comic counterparts, as opposed to the black and green uniforms they wore in Superman: The Animated Series. Representatives of the Guardians of the Universe attended John Stewart's trial where they spoke in his defense when John Stewart was supposedly responsible for causing a planet to explode when he fired a beam from his ring during his pursuing of Kanjar Ro. After the trial when the planet was revealed to not be destroyed and was revealed to be cloaked by Kanjar Ro in collaboration with the Manhunters, Superman and the other Justice League members present demanded answers about the Manhunters. The lead Guardian present stated that the Manhunters were their first law enforcement agents before they started the Green Lantern Corps. The Guardians of the Universe later tried to defend Oa from an attack by the Manhunters. The Justice League came to their aid as John Stewart uses the power of his ring combined with the Central Power Ring to destroy the Manhunters.
 The Guardians of the Universe appear briefly in the beginning of the Justice League Unlimited episode "The Return", voiced by an uncredited Clancy Brown. They deny Stewart's request to leave Earth and take a tour of duty on Oa. They even denied John's request to have Kyle Rayner cover for him.
 Ganthet appears in the Duck Dodgers episode "The Green Loontern". The other Guardians are oddly absent from this episode.
 The Guardians of the Universe briefly appeared without dialogue at the end of the Batman: The Brave and the Bold episode "The Eyes of Despero". They have been placed in Hal Jordan's ring for safe keeping while he fought Despero. The Guardians of the Universe were later fully featured in the episode "Revenge of the Reach", voiced by J.K. Simmons and Armin Shimerman. They explain the connection between the Blue Beetle's scarab and the Reach.
 The Guardians of the Universe appear in Green Lantern: The Animated Series with Ganthet voiced by Ian Abercrombie, Appa Ali Apsa voiced by Brian George, Sayd voiced by Susan Blakeslee, and Scar voiced by Sarah Douglas.
 The Guardians of the Universe appear in "#TheGreenRoom", a Season 2 episode of the animated series DC Super Hero Girls. They preside over a disciplinary hearing for Jessica Cruz, who has been charged with dereliction of duty related to an alien attack on Metropolis.

Film
Live action
The Guardians of the Universe appear in the live-action Green Lantern film. A rogue Guardian of the Universe tried to control the Yellow energies of Fear, but was consumed by it, and become known as Parallax. In the special features included in the Blu-ray edition of the film, the names of the Guardians appearing in the film are listed in the featurette "The Guardians revealed": Ganthet, who is the male Guardian that mainly speaks, in the same way, Sayd, the female Guardian, along with Appa Ali Apsa, Scar, Raugniad, Nguanzo, Pazu, Basil, Baris, Herupa, and Krona.

Animation
 The Guardians of the Universe make an appearance in Justice League: The New Frontier, voiced by Robin Atkin Downes. They guide Hal Jordan on the use of his Green Lantern ring against Dinosaur Island.
 The Guardians of the Universe appear in the animated feature Green Lantern: First Flight with Ganthet voiced by Larry Drake, Appa Ali Apsa voiced by William Schallert, and Ranakar voiced by Malachi Throne. Unlike the comic book incarnations, they are fully capable of emotions, often bickering amongst themselves, and also unlike their comic book selves, they are significantly less powerful. Ranakar sees Sinestro as their finest Green Lantern, and doesn't particularly like Hal Jordan. He's the first to defend Sinestro when Hal warns him of his deception, even though Kilowog confirms it, and was willing to let Sinestro explain himself. When Sinestro returns with the "yellow element", Ranakar became infuriated of his betrayal (and for being called a "stupid little troll"), and accepts Hal Jordan upon defeating Sinestro. Ganthet was the only supporter of Hal Jordan before the rest of the Guardians; he would even help Jordan when he tries to find his ring during the battle against Sinestro. Appa Ali Apsa is the more neutral of the three main Guardians, and mostly seems to want to run the organization as smoothly as possible.
 The Guardians of the Universe appear in the animated feature Green Lantern: Emerald Knights, with Ganthet voiced by radio personality Michael Jackson, Appa Ali Apsa voiced by Tony Amendola, and Ranakar voiced by Steven Blum.
 In the animated movie Justice League: War, the Guardians are mentioned several times by Hal Jordan. They later appear in Justice League Dark: Apokolips War. They were present on Oa when Darkseid and his Paradooms attack and are killed by Darkseid.

Video games
 The Guardians of the Universe make a brief appearance in the Mortal Kombat vs. DC Universe video game with Ganthet voiced by Michael McConnohie and two unnamed Guardians voiced by Christopher Corey Smith and Joe J. Thomas. In the story mode on the DC Universe part, they inform Green Lantern, Lex Luthor, and Catwoman about the merging of the universes when the hero and villains arrive on Oa.
 The Guardians of the Universe are featured in Green Lantern: Rise of the Manhunters. Like the comics, the Guardians of the Universe are responsible for creating the Manhunters some time before the creation of the Green Lantern Corps.
 The Guardians of the Universe make two cameo appearances in Injustice: Gods Among Us. During Green Lantern's Super Move, he transports himself and his enemy to OA and proceeds to attack his opponent with constructs in front of the central power battery, and The Guardians. In one of the final scenes of game, Green Lantern hands over his counterpart and Sinestro to the Guardians of the Universe to stand trial.
 The Guardians of the Universe appear as NPCs in Lego DC Super-Villains'', with Ganthet voiced by Brian George.

References

  Some of the content in this article was copied from Green Lantern Wiki, which is licensed under the Creative Commons Attribution-Share Alike 3.0 (Unported) (CC-BY-SA) license.

External links
 Alaln Kistler's Profile on Green Lantern

Superhero film characters
DC Comics aliens
DC Comics deities 
DC Comics characters who are shapeshifters
Characters created by John Broome
Characters created by Gil Kane
Green Lantern characters
Green Lantern Corps officers 
Fictional characters who can manipulate reality 
Fictional characters who can manipulate time 
Fictional characters who can manipulate light
Fictional characters with death or rebirth abilities
Fictional characters with energy-manipulation abilities
Fictional characters with immortality 
Fictional characters with superhuman senses
Fictional characters who can change size 
Fictional characters who can turn intangible
Fictional characters with elemental transmutation abilities
DC Comics characters who have mental powers
Fictional illusionists
DC Comics characters who can teleport
DC Comics telekinetics
DC Comics telepaths